Gustavo Enrique García Figueroa (born 21 June 1980 in Zacatepec, Morelos) is a Mexican footballer, who plays as a defender for San Luis F.C.

Garcia made his debut during the Clausura 2004 with San Luis. For the Apertura 2005, Garcia was transferred to Club América, but did not make a senior appearance for América. At the end of the Clausura 2005 season Garcia was transferred to San Luis.

See also
List of people from Morelos, Mexico

References

External links

1980 births
Living people
Club América footballers
San Luis F.C. players
Footballers from Morelos
Association football defenders
Mexican footballers